FGE may refer to:
 Fly Georgia, a defunct Georgian airline
 Formylglycine-generating enzyme
 Fruit Growers Express, an American refrigerator car line